Fabiano Luigi Caruana (born July 30, 1992) is an Italian and American chess grandmaster. A chess prodigy, Caruana became a grandmaster at the age of 14 years, 11 months, and 20 days—the youngest grandmaster in the history of both Italy and the United States at the time.

Born in Miami to Italian parents, Caruana grew up in Park Slope, Brooklyn. He played for the United States until 2005, when he transferred his national federation affiliation to Italy. He earned his grandmaster title in 2007, and in the same year won his first Italian Chess Championship, a feat he repeated in 2008, 2010, and 2011. He won the Dortmund Sparkassen Chess Meeting in 2012, 2014, and 2015. Caruana also won the Sinquefield Cup 2014, recording a 3098 performance rating, the highest in history at the elite level, and improving his rating to 2844, becoming the third-highest rated player in history. He transferred back to the United States in 2015.

Having won the FIDE Grand Prix 2014–15, Caruana qualified for the Candidates Tournament 2016, where he was runner-up to Sergey Karjakin. He won the London Chess Classic in 2017. Caruana won the Candidates Tournament 2018, becoming the first American challenger for the undisputed World Chess Championship since Bobby Fischer in 1972. In the run-up to the championship match, he won the 5th Grenke Chess Classic, the 6th Norway Chess, and shared first in the 6th Sinquefield Cup. Caruana lost the match to Magnus Carlsen in the rapid tiebreaks after drawing all twelve of the classical games.

In addition to his strength in classical time controls, Caruana is highly ranked in rapid and blitz chess. As of November 2022, Caruana is ranked 11th on the FIDE rapid (with an ELO rating of 2747) and 3rd on the blitz lists (with an ELO rating of 2847).

Personal life and chess beginnings 
Caruana was born on July 30, 1992, in Miami, Florida United States, to Italian parents Lou and Santina Caruana. He is a dual citizen of Italy and the United States. When he was four, his family relocated from Miami to the neighborhood of Park Slope, Brooklyn, New York City. When he was five, his chess talent was discovered in an after-school chess program at Congregation Beth Elohim, a reform Jewish congregation in Park Slope. That year he played his first tournament at the Polgar Chess Center in Queens, New York City.

Until the age of twelve, he lived and played in the United States, occasionally traveling to Europe and South America to participate in tournaments. His first chess coach, from age six to eight, was National Master (NM) Bruce Pandolfini, and from age eight to twelve, he studied with GM Miron Sher. In 2004, he relocated with his family from Brooklyn to Madrid, Spain to pursue a professional chess career, playing for Italy from 2005 to 2015. He trained with International Master (IM) Boris Zlotnik in Madrid, and in 2007 he moved to Budapest to train with grandmaster Alexander Chernin. In 2010, he moved to Lugano, Switzerland, and, at the end of that year, started to train with grandmaster Vladimir Chuchelov. He moved to St. Louis, Missouri in 2014.

Chess career

2007 
In July, Caruana won the "First Saturday" GM tournament in Budapest with seven points out of nine games. He obtained his final GM norm and at age 14 years, 11 months, and 20 days, became the youngest grandmaster of both the United States and Italy, surpassing the US record set by Hikaru Nakamura. Caruana played the strong Vlissingen chess tournament in the Netherlands in August. His last round opponent was former FIDE world champion Rustam Kasimdzhanov. Caruana, playing black, drew the game in 82 moves, and won the tournament with a performance of 2715. In November and December, Caruana participated in the Italian Championship. In 2006, he was the co-champion of Italy by tying with Michele Godena but losing the fifth rapid play-off game. In 2007, he won with a score of +8 (9½/11) to become the youngest ever Italian champion.

2008 
In January, Caruana had his first experience at Corus C and throughout much of the tournament he was the clear leader. His last round opponent was Parimarjan Negi, and Caruana needed ½ point to win the tournament. Caruana won the game in 61 moves and the tournament with a final score of +7 (10/13) and performance of 2696.
April saw him playing in the Ruy Lopez Festival which included a seven-round closed tournament, and a two-day rapid open tournament. In the seven round closed tournament, Caruana had a disappointing result of −2 (2½/7) with performance of 2513. The two-day rapid open tournament that followed was won by Caruana with a score of +6 (7½/9) followed by Michael Adams, Julio Granda Zuniga, and Dzhurabek Khamrakulov all with a score of +5 (7/9). In June Caruana played first board for Italy at the Mitropa Cup, which is a four-board team competition amongst 10 "middle" European nations. He scored +6 (7½/9) winning the first board prize with performance of 2810. In August the NH Chess Tournament "Rising Stars vs. Experienced" was played with Scheveningen format which is a double round team match of five "Rising Stars" against five "Experienced" players. Caruana played against Evgeny Bareev, Viktor Korchnoi, Artur Jussupow, Simen Agdestein, and Ljubomir Ljubojević. He scored +3 (6½/10) with performance of 2706. In October and November: Caruana played at Eighth Cap d'Agde Rapid Chess Tournament, held in Cap d'Agde, a knock-out closed rapid tournament organized into two round robin groups of eight players each, with the top four scorers of each group proceeding to the quarter-finals, the semi-finals, and then the finals. The time control was 25 minutes with a 10-second increment. In his group, Caruana placed first with a score of +4 (5½/7) winning against Maxime Vachier-Lagrave, Xiangzhi Bu, Alexandra Kosteniuk, Marie Sebag, and drawing against Vasyl Ivanchuk, Ivan Cheparinov, and Kateryna Lahno. Caruana's performance was 2866 and he had qualified to enter the quarter-finals. His quarter-final match, which was against Anatoly Karpov, was closely fought. Karpov won the first game, and Caruana won the second. Then tie-break games with time control of 15 minutes were played. The first four games were all drawn. The fifth game Karpov won, and Caruana was knocked out. In November Caruana played at 38th Olympiad, his first Olympiad. On the first board for Italy he played against Levon Aronian in the first round, Viktor Korchnoi in the fourth round, Michael Adams in the fifth round, Emanuel Berg in the seventh round, and Peter Leko in the eighth round. He lost to Aronian and Leko, and won against Adams, Korchnoi, and Berg. His final score was 7½/11 with performance of 2696. When winter rolled around in November and December, Caruana successfully defended his title winning the Italian Championship for the second consecutive year with a score of +5 (8/11).

2009 
In February, Caruana—having won Corus C 2008—received and accepted invitation to Corus B 2009 which was of category 16 with average Elo of 2641. Throughout the tournament his standings ranged from first to third place. Going into the last round he was tied for second and his opponent was Nigel Short who was in clear first. The game lasted 67 moves. Caruana won the game and the tournament with a score of +4 (8½/13) and performance of 2751. Caruana is the first player ever to win both Corus C and Corus B in consecutive years placing clear first in both. In April he played in the Russian Team Championship at Sochi with the "Club 64" of Moscow, scoring 5 points out of 6; his team placed second after Tomsk. In May he played with the Italian team in the "Mitropa Cup" at Rogaska Slatina in Slovenia, scoring 6 points out of 8 and winning the individual gold medal on first board. By November Caruana was entered in and played in the Chess World Cup 2009 at Khanty-Mansiysk in Russia. In the first two rounds he beat the Cuban grandmasters Lázaro Bruzón and Leinier Domínguez (Elo 2719), in the third the Russian Evgeny Alekseev (Elo 2715); in round four he lost, only in the rapid games, to Vugar Gashimov (Elo 2759 and seventh in the world). This performance allowed him to reach 2675 points Elo.

2010 
In July, Caruana won the Young Grandmaster Section of Biel 2010 after a playoff with the others two leaders Maxime Vachier-Lagrave and Nguyễn Ngọc Trường Sơn. In December he won the Italian Championship for the third time with a score of 9 points out of 11 games. In the period from December 2010–January 2011 Caruana played in the 53rd Reggio Emilia Tournament. He placed 6th out of 10 and tied 7 out of his 9 games (only winning, again, against Nigel Short).

2011 
In January, at the Gibraltar Masters, he finished on place 5 behind Ivanchuk, Short, Külaots and Roiz. In July, he won with 7 points out of 10 at the AAI tournament in New Delhi (category 17). In December he won the Italian National Championship for the fourth time with a score of 10 points out of 11 games. He had previously won the 2007 and 2008 national championships, and did not play the 2009 national championship due to a calendar conflict with the FIDE World Cup.

2012 

In January, at the 74th Tata Steel Chess Tournament A in Wijk aan Zee (previously known as Corus Chess), he finished on place second together with Magnus Carlsen and Teimour Radjabov, behind the winner Levon Aronian. In March at the 27th Reykjavik Open in Reykjavík, Iceland, he finished first with 7½/9. In May he won the 20th Sigeman & Co Chess Tournament, an eight-player round-robin tournament, in Malmö, Sweden, with 5½/7, half point ahead of Peter Leko. June saw him at the 7th Tal Memorial where he finished second with a score of 5½/9 after tiebreak with Teimour Radjabov behind Magnus Carlsen. By July, at the 40th Dortmund Sparkassen Chess Meeting, he was victorious once again with a score of 6/9 after tiebreak with Sergey Karjakin. In the fall, in the period from September–October, he played in the Grand Slam Chess Final in São Paulo and Bilbao, Caruana won 4 games, drew 5 and lost 1, tying for 1st with Magnus Carlsen, but eventually losing both blitz tiebreak games and thus ending 2nd. In November at the 6th Kings Tournament, organized in Bucharest by the Romanian capital chess club, Caruana tied all the games to get third in a shortlist, yet strong tournament (average Elo 2747) behind Vasyl Ivanchuk, winner, and Veselin Topalov, runner-up.

2013 

In February–March, Caruana won with four points out of six games the Zurich Chess Challenge. In April at the third stage of the FIDE Grand Prix Series 2012–2013 held in Zug, Switzerland, with six points out of 11 games, Caruana shared third place with Ruslan Ponomariov, behind the winner, Veselin Topalov, and the runner-up, Hikaru Nakamura. In May–June at the fourth stage of the "FIDE Grand Prix Series 2012–2013" held in Thessaloniki, Greece, Caruana shared second place with Gata Kamsky, behind the winner, Leinier Domínguez Pérez. In June at the eighth edition of the Tal Memorial Chess Tournament, held in Moscow, Caruana with five points out nine games finished third after tiebreak with Shakhriyar Mamedyarov and Dmitry Andreikin, behind the winner, Boris Gelfand, and the runner-up, Magnus Carlsen. In September–October he shared first place with Boris Gelfand with 5 points out 9 games at the sixth leg of the FIDE Grand Prix, held in Paris. In the final game against Dominguez Perez, Caruana had to win with the black pieces to hope to win the tournament solo and qualify for the Candidate's Tournament, but he repeated moves early in the opening finishing with a fast draw. In October he won the seventh edition of the Kings Tournament in Bucharest, Romania, with five points out of eight games.

2014 
In January, at the Tata Steel Chess Tournament in Wijk aan Zee, Netherlands, Caruana finished fourth with 6 points out 11 games. In the end of January into early February, at the Zurich Chess Challenge in Zürich, Switzerland, Caruana won the rapid section with four points out of five games and shared second place with Levon Aronian in combined final results (classical and rapid time controls), behind the winner Magnus Carlsen. In April at Shamkir Chess 2014, a six-player double round-robin tournament held in Shamkir, Azerbaijan, in memory of Vugar Gashimov, Caruana finished second with 5½ points out of 10 games, behind the winner Magnus Carlsen. In June at Norway Chess 2014, a ten-player tournament, Caruana finished fourth with 4½ points out of 9 games. In June at the FIDE World Rapid Championship held in Dubai, Caruana finished second with 10½ points out of 15 games, after tiebreaks with Viswanathan Anand, Levon Aronian and Alexander Morozevich, half point behind the winner Magnus Carlsen. With this result Caruana in July topped the FIDE rapid ranking with 2858 points. In FIDE World Blitz Championship, also held in Dubai, Caruana finished in the middle of the group, confirming some difficulties with short time control. In July, Caruana won with 5½ points out of 7 games the Dortmund Sparkassen Chess Meeting, breaking for the first time the 2800 Elo points bar. By August Caruana was playing on the first board for Italy at the 41st Chess Olympiad in Tromsø, Norway, finishing with 6½ points out of 9 games. In the period from August–September, Caruana won with 8½ points out of 10 games the Sinquefield Cup in Saint Louis, Missouri, one of the strongest tournaments ever held, featuring six of the world's top ten players, including the world champion Magnus Carlsen. With seven consecutive wins from the start (for a FIDE performance rating of almost 3600), 3 draws and 0 losses, Caruana ultimately achieved a performance rating of over 3100, possibly the best tournament result in history, beating out Magnus Carlsen in the 2009 Nanjing Pearl Spring tournament and Anatoly Karpov in the 1994 Linares chess tournament. In October he won along with Boris Gelfand the Baku stage of the FIDE Grand Prix 2014–15, a 12-player round-robin, with 6½ points out of 11 games. The loss at round 7 against Dmitry Andreikin ended a streak of 22 points out of 27 games and no losses started in August. In the period of late October through early November, Caruana shared fourth place with six points out of 11 games at the Tashkent leg of the FIDE Grand Prix. December saw him at the 6th London Chess Classic, a six-player round-robin; he shared last place with four draws and one loss in five games.

2015 
In January, Caruana played in the 2015 Tata Steel Chess Tournament, a 14-player round-robin, where he finished seventh, with seven points out 13 games, behind the winner Magnus Carlsen. In February he was at the 2015 Grenke Chess Classic in Baden-Baden, an eight-player round-robin. He shared third and fourth positions, with four points out seven games, behind the winner Magnus Carlsen. In February at 2015 Zurich Chess Challenge, a 6 players tournament, Caruana shared second place in Blitz Section with 3½ points out 5 games, shared the last place with 2 points out of 5 games in Classical Section, finished last with 1½ points out 5 games in Rapid Section and finished fifth in Combined Final Results (Classical & Rapid TC) behind the winner Hikaru Nakamura. In April at the Shamkir Chess 2015, a 10 players tournament, Caruana finished fourth with five points out of nine games behind the winner Magnus Carlsen. In May, Caruana won along with Hikaru Nakamura and Dmitry Jakovenko the FIDE Grand Prix Khanty-Mansiysk 2015, a 12-player round-robin, with 6½ points out of 11 games. With this result Caruana won the FIDE Grand Prix 2014–15 and qualified for the 2016 Candidates Tournament. In June he played in the Norway Chess 2015, a 10-player tournament, where he finished fifth with 4 points out of 9 games behind the winner Veselin Topalov. In June–July: Caruana won the Dortmund Sparkassen Chess Meeting, an eight-player single-round robin tournament, with 5½ points out of 7 possible points, ending the tournament with a 5-game win-streak. In August–September he finished 8th at the 2015 Sinquefield Cup with 3½ out of nine possible points. In September, at the Chess World Cup 2015, a 128-player single-elimination tournament, Caruana was eliminated in the fourth round by Shakhriyar Mamedyarov. In December, Caruana competed in the final leg of the Grand Chess Tour, the London Chess Classic. He achieved the arguably boring result of nine draws out of nine games (+0-0=9).

2016 

In January, at the 2016 Tata Steel Chess Tournament, Caruana shared second (along with Ding Liren) with a score of 8 points out of 13 (+5-2=6), defeating Michael Adams, Wei Yi, Loek Van Wely, Pavel Eljanov, and Ding Liren, and losing to David Navara and Evgeny Tomashevsky. Had he defeated Tomashevsky, he would have at least tied for 1st place with Magnus Carlsen. Through this tournament, he gained 7 rating points and moved to #3 in the world. By March, as part of the qualification cycle for the World Chess Championship 2016, Caruana participated in the Candidates Tournament 2016, held in Moscow, Russia, from March 10–30 in the Central Telegraph (Центральный телеграф) Building. The lineup of the tournament included Viswanathan Anand, Hikaru Nakamura, Sergey Karjakin, Peter Svidler, Veselin Topalov, Anish Giri, and Levon Aronian. In the final round Caruana had Black against Sergey Karjakin in a winner-takes-all game. A complex position developed in which he made a mistake and was eventually defeated, making Karjakin the official challenger. Caruana eventually finished with a +1 score. On April 25, Caruana became US Chess Champion for the first time, after defeating IM Akshat Chandra in the last round of the US Chess Championship. He finished the tournament with 8.5 points out of 11 games, and went undefeated. The field consisted of world top ten players Hikaru Nakamura and Wesley So; top 100 players Ray Robson, Sam Shankland, Gata Kamsky, and Alexander Onischuk; GMs Alexander Shabalov, Varuzhan Akobian, Jeffery Xiong and Aleksandr Lenderman; and IM Akshat Chandra. In September, he played first board of the US Team at the 42nd Chess Olympiad. The US team won the gold medal, while Caruana won the bronze medal for first board.

2017 

Caruana began the year rated 2827, ranked No. 2 in the world. However, his rating would slip in the coming months. He played the Tradewise Gibraltar Chess Festival in March and finished with a score of 7/10, suffering one loss to Nigel Short in Round 6. At the US Championships, Caruana finished T-3rd with 6/11. He lost two games during the tournament and needed to win his last two games just to finish with a positive score, which he did. At the conclusion, his ranking dropped to No. 4. He finished T-2nd at the Grenke Chess Classic, but was 1½ points behind the winner Levon Aronian. Caruana next played in the Norway Chess event, where he finished in the middle of the standings with 4½/9. His lone win came against Hikaru Nakamura and his lone loss came against Vishwanathan Anand.

Caruana continued to struggle through the middle of the year. He finished the Sinquefield Cup in July towards the bottom of the standings with a score of 4/9 (+1-2=6). His last round loss to Peter Svidler knocked his August rating below 2800 for the first time since April 2016. At the World Cup, Caruana made it to the third round. Evgeniy Najer eliminated him in the rapid tiebreak rounds by winning with the black pieces. The World Cup tightened the race between Caruana, Wesley So, and Vladimir Kramnik for the two ratings qualification spots to the 2018 Candidates Tournament to within a few points. However, Kramnik's loss in a classical game against Ivanchuk during the tournament left him in a distant third with only two months remaining.

The World Cup set the stage for the next major tournament, the Isle of Man Open, which both Caruana and Kramnik were playing. The first round pairings were decided by the players drawing names out of a raffle tumbler. Kramnik, choosing second because he was the 2nd-highest rated player at the event, chose Caruana as his first round opponent. With the white pieces, Caruana defeated Kramnik to put himself and So in a good position to qualify for the Candidates Tournament. Kramnik's surprise loss to James Tarjan, who quit chess for a few decades to become a librarian, further helped solidify Caruana and So as the ratings qualifiers. Furthermore, Kramnik ended up receiving a wild card into the Candidates event, officially clinching the qualifications for Caruana and So.

In December 2017 with the Candidates qualification already decided, Caruana rebounded and won his only tournament of the year at the London Chess Classic in tiebreaks. He won three games and drew the remaining six (+3-0=6). Ian Nepomniachtchi had the sole lead entering the final round after winning three consecutive games in rounds six through eight. However, Caruana was able to come from behind by defeating Mickey Adams in his last game. After drawing the rapid tiebreaks, Caruana won one of the two blitz games to clinch the tournament.

2018 

In January, Caruana finished 11th with a score of 5/13 at the Tata Steel Masters tournament. In March, he won the Candidates Tournament 2018 with a score of 9/14, thus winning the right to challenge Magnus Carlsen in the World Chess Championship 2018 in London in November 2018.

From 31 March to 9 April, Caruana competed in the 5th Grenke Chess Classic. He won the event with a score of 6½/9 (+4–0=5), a point ahead of runner-up Carlsen. With this result he moved to No. 2 in the live world rankings. From 17 to 30 April, he competed in 2018 U.S. Chess Championship, placing second with 8/11 (+6–1=4), half a point behind champion Sam Shankland.

In June, he won the sixth edition of Norway Chess, finishing clear first with a score of 5/8 (+3–1=4), despite having lost to Carlsen in the first round. In August, he jointly won the 6th Sinquefield Cup with Carlsen and Aronian. He also defeated So in a playoff for a place at the London Chess Classic being held in December.

Caruana faced Carlsen in the World Chess Championship 2018 from November 9 to 28. All 12 classical time control games were drawn. Carlsen then won the rapid tiebreak games 3–0.
During game four of the 2018 World Chess Championships, a video containing Caruana's preparation files was released onto the Saint Louis Chess Club YouTube channel. In an interview much later, Caruana admitted that he had been only made aware of this, by his second Cristian Chirilă, before the Round 4 press conference.

2019 
From May to November, Caruana competed in the Grand Chess Tour as one of 12 regular participants. He finished in joint-10th place after the first 7 events, thus failing to qualify for the finals at the London Chess Classic.

2020 

In January, he won the Category 20 2020 Tata Steel Masters with a round to spare, scoring 10/13 (+7–0=6), two points ahead of second-placed Magnus Carlsen. As a result, he reached a rating of 2842 on the February FIDE rating list, his highest since October 2014. As the runner-up of the 2018 World Championship, Caruana automatically qualified for the 2020 Candidates Tournament, which began 17 March 2020. The tournament was suspended halfway through due to the COVID-19 pandemic. At the time of the postponement, Caruana was tied for third place out of eight players with a score of 3.5 out of 7. The Candidates resumed on April 19, 2021, and ended on April 28, 2021. Caruana ended with 7½/14 points (3 wins, 9 draws, and 2 losses). Caruana tied for third place but due to tie-breaks placed fourth out of eight.

2021 
Caruana played in the continuation of Candidates Tournament 2020–2021 from April 19 to April 28 and finished in fourth place on tiebreaks with a score of 7.5/10 (+3-2=9)   His win against MVL in round 8 was considered an impressive show of preparation and play, where he sacrificed 3 pawns and a piece (a novelty) in the Poisoned Pawn variation of the Najdorf Sicilian.

Following the Candidates, from July 12 to July 20, Caruana played in the Chess World Cup, but was eliminated in the third round by Rinat Jumabayev.

From August 9 to August 16, Caruana played in the 2021 St Louis Rapid and Blitz taking second behind Hikaru Nakamura. Following that, from August 16 to August 28, he played in the Sinquefield Cup tying for second behind winner MVL with 5.5/9 points (+3-1=5)  and a tournament performance rating of 2824, which earned him $45,000 and 8.3 GCT points. In the Grand Chess Tour, he placed fourth overall behind MVL, Wesley So and Mamedyarov.

From October 5 to October 19, Caruana then participated in the 2021 US Chess Championship held at the Saint Louis Chess Club in Missouri, where he scored 2nd place with a score of 6.5/11 after losing to GM Wesley So in the rapid tiebreaks.

In November, Caruana was runner-up in the FIDE Grand Swiss Tournament 2021 with a score of 7.5/11 (+4-0=7) and a tournament performance rating of 2807, behind Alireza Firouzja, which qualified him for the Candidates Tournament 2022.

Between December 18 and December 23, Caruana also participated in the 2021 Vugar Gashimov Memorial, where he edged out Richard Rapport in an armaggedon playoff to win first place.

Three days later, from December 26 to December 28, 2021, Caruana participated in the 2021 FIDE World Rapid Championship, where he ended up as one of the joint leaders with 9.5/13 points, but ultimately finished 4th place as he could not advance to the playoffs due to controversial tiebreak rules. Subsequently, on the 28th and 29th, he played the FIDE World Blitz Championship, ranking 39th.

In 2021, Caruana split with his long time coach/second, Rustam Kasimdzhanov, with Kasimdzhanov citing that the pandemic affected their relationship and opportunities to work together.

Apart from the events he played, Caruana also participated in the coverage of the World Chess Championship 2021 in November and December 2021, along with Daniel Rensch and Robert Hess, for Chess.com.

2022
From the 14th to the 30th of January, Caruana participated in the Tata Steel Chess Tournament 2022, placing 8th with a score of 6.5/14.
He has also been participating in the Chess.com RCC and, as of August 2022, is in third place and has progressed to the finals with 62 points, behind Hikaru Nakamura (102 points) and Dmitry Andreikin (73 points).

In April 2022, he won the inaugural American Cup, a double-elimination tournament in Missouri, ahead of Levon Aronian, Wesley So, and Lenier Dominguez.

From June 16 to July 5, Caruana participated in the Candidates Tournament held in Madrid, having qualified to play by being the runner-up in the Grand Swiss in 2021 behind Alireza Firouzja. Caruana finished 5th with a score of 6.5/14 (+3-4=7) despite being 2nd behind tournament leader Ian Nepomniachtchi after the end of the first half of the tournament.

From July 28 to August 9, Caruana played board 1 for the US at the 44th Chess Olympiad in Chennai where his team finished 5th despite being seeded 1st. He finished the event with a score of 5/10 (+3-3=4) and a tournament performance rating of 2645.

From August 26 to August 30, Caruana participated in the Saint Louis Rapid & Blitz tournament, as part of the Grand Chess Tour and finished in third place, after Alireza Firouzja and Hikaru Nakamura. The next month, Caruana participated in the Sinquefield Cup, finishing tied 3rd alongside compatriot Wesley So with 4.5/8 points and behind runner-up Ian Nepomniachtchi and winner Alireza Firouzja. His two consecutive third-place finishes earned him enough points to finish in fourth place in the Grand Chess Tour – just 1 point short of 3rd place. Caruana followed this up with a victory in the Champions Showdown: Chess 9LX, a rapid chess 960 tournament held in Saint Louis, after defeating Alireza Firouzja in the playoffs for the title. His first-place finish earned him $31,250.

From October 5 to October 19, Caruana participated in the 2022 US Chess Championship, winning ahead of Wesley So, Levon Aronian, and Lenier Dominguez, among others.

Caruana finished third in World Rapid Chess Championship 2022 by defeating Vladislav Artemiev , Vladimir Fedoseev and drawing against Magnus Carlsen,  he finished with score of (9.5/13) .

Playing style 
As a youth, Caruana had an aggressive style of play. He later said "I preferred to attack all the time and really loved sacrificing pieces to get at the enemy king. I played like that for quite a long time, but when I moved up it turned out that you can far from always win with a direct attack; ... I had to become universal, to learn to manoeuvre and defend and so on." Caruana's playing style is now universal, based on opening preparation and calculation: "I wouldn't assess it in such categories [tactical or strategic]. It seems to me I'm a good fighter. I enjoy playing different types of position, both tactical and strategic. I can't say there's anything I avoid. I can attack on a board full of pieces or manoeuvre in a roughly even position, and I've got nothing against the endgame."

Caruana has been hailed by Magnus Carlsen as a player who has an edge in calculations and opening preparation over most of his contemporaries (bar Carlsen himself). Carlsen has also described him as "undogmatic", but someone who may not play as well in simpler positions. This sentiment has been echoed largely in the chess world, with Caruana having earned himself a nickname of "The Machine".

Caruana is known as a hard working player, once saying: "Hundreds of games are played each day all around the world, and a lot of them are important. They're all available online, but you have to put in the time to look at them all. And you need to analyze, find new trends, keep trying to find new ideas to use against specific opponents." Talking about Magnus Carlsen's play, Caruana hinted at his deep knowledge of the opponent's strengths and weaknesses: "In some positions you can't compete with him. Certain pawn structures he just plays like a machine. There are certain openings where I say, 'I just can't do that.' But OK, certain positions he's not as comfortable with. Just like any player, he can also play unconfidently."

Federations and national championships

National Chess Federation membership 
 Caruana is a "Benefactor" Life Member of the United States Chess Federation (USCF), and has been a member of the federation since the age of 5 in 1998.

National Chess Federation ranking 
 United States Chess Federation: fourth-highest ranked player

National Championships 
 Italy – Caruana won the Italian National Championship in 2007, 2008, 2010, and 2011. He did not play the championship in 2009 and 2012–2014.
 United States – Caruana won the U.S. Chess Championship in 2016 (his first participation) and 2022.

World Chess Federation (FIDE) affiliation 
Caruana possesses dual citizenship of both Italy and the United States, so he has the option of FIDE affiliation with either the Italian Chess Federation or the United States Chess Federation.

Caruana played for Italy from 2005 to 2015. On May 12, 2015, the USCF announced that he would be changing federations, to play for the United States.

References

Notes

External links 

 
 
 
 
 
 
 
 
 
 C-Squared Podcast – podcast hosted together with Ioan-Cristian Chirilă

News items and interviews 
 Edward Winter's "Books about Leading Modern Chessplayers" (Chess Notes Feature Article)
 Biography from Chessbase.com
 "Being a Grandmaster Is Tough When You Are Not Quite 15 " The New York Times, July 29, 2007
 "A Chess Player's Challenge: Opponents His Own Age" The New York Times, May 17, 2003
 2007 Italian Championship interview from Chessbase.com
 "Fabulous Fabiano", by Macauley Peterson, Chess Life, January 2008, pp. 30–35.
   – by Janis Nisii, Torre & Cavallo Scacco!, February 2008, pp. 5–9 

1992 births
Living people
American chess players
American people of Italian descent
Chess grandmasters
Chess Olympiad competitors
Italian chess players
Sportspeople from Brooklyn
Sportspeople from Miami
People from Park Slope